Julia Florence Parker (born February 1928) is a Coast Miwok-Kashaya Pomo basket weaver.

Parker studied with some of the leading 20th century indigenous Californian basketweavers: Lucy Telles (Yosemite Miwok-Mono Lake Paiute); Mabel McKay, (Cache Creek Pomo-Patwin) and Elsie Allen (Cloverdale Pomo). Over the last 40 years, Parker has become one of the preeminent Native American basket makers in California. She is a respected elder of the Federated Indians of Graton Rancheria and long-time resident of Yosemite Valley.

Parker is prolific artist, teacher, and storyteller.

Background
Julia Parker was born in February 1928 in Marin County, California. Her father was Coast Miwok, and her mother was Kashaya Pomo. They both died when Parker was still young, so she and her siblings were sent to a Native American boarding school. In 1945, when Parker was 17 years old, she married Ralph Parker. Ralph, grandson of Lucy Telles, is thought to be the last fullblood Mono Lake Paiute. The couple moved to Yosemite, where Parker began her studies of basketry with Telles. She continued her training with Carrie Bethel, Minnie Mike, and Elsie Allen.

Career
Since 1960, Parker has worked as a cultural specialist at the Yosemite Museum and interprets the cultural history of Yosemite Valley tribes to park visitors. She took over for Lucy Telles as the cultural demonstrator at the park. She demonstrates basket weaving and acorn processing. She has taught and lectured across the United States at universities, cultural centers, and schools. She has traveled to Alaska, Hawaii, and Australia to meet with indigenous artists and has been invited by numerous museums, including the National Museum of the American Indian, George Gustav Heye Center in New York City, to consult with specialists about collections stored in their facilities.

Exhibitions and awards
In 2004, Parker's work was the subject of a major retrospective exhibition, The Past in Present Tense: Four Decades of Julia Parker Baskets, curated by Deborah Valoma and installed at the Bedford Gallery in Walnut Creek. In the same year she was featured in a segment of KQED television's program, Spark.

Parker's work is in permanent collections of the National Museum of Natural History, Smithsonian Institution, Washington, DC; the Yosemite Museum, Yosemite National Park; the Norwegian Ski Association headquarters, Oslo, Norway; the private collection of Queen Elizabeth II of the United Kingdom; and numerous other private collections.

In 2006, California College of the Arts conferred an honorary doctorate on Parker; in May 2021 she received an honorary doctorate from California State University, Fresno.

In 2007, Parker was the recipient of a National Heritage Fellowship from the National Endowment for the Arts, the United States' highest honor in the folk and traditional arts.

Further reading
 Native American Women: A Biographical Dictionary, p. 232

 Valoma, Deborah. Scrape the Willow Until It Sings: The Words and Work of Basket Maker Julia Parker (2013)

References

External links 
 Julia Parker – Grandmother's Prayer, DVD, produced by Wallace Murray and Tim Campbell, filmed at Kule Loklo in Point Reyes

20th-century Native American women
20th-century Native Americans
21st-century Native American women
21st-century Native Americans
Native American basket weavers
Native American women artists
American women artists
Women basketweavers
National Heritage Fellowship winners
Miwok people
Pomo people
Native American people from California
Yosemite National Park
People from Mariposa County, California
People from Marin County, California
1928 births
Living people
Artists from California